Lasbek is a municipality in the district of Stormarn, in Schleswig-Holstein, Germany.

See also
 Krummbek Manor

References

Stormarn (district)